Old Buckhead is an unincorporated community in Fairfield County, in the U.S. state of South Carolina.

History
A variant name is "Buckhead". The community was named for the deer which abounded in the area. A post office called Buckhead was established in 1825, and remained in operation until 1912.

References

Unincorporated communities in South Carolina
Unincorporated communities in Fairfield County, South Carolina